Frank Dunlap Pavey (November 10, 1860 in Washington Court House, Fayette County, Ohio – April 15, 1946) was an American lawyer and politician from New York.

Life
He graduated B.A. from Yale College in 1884, LL.B. from Yale Law School in 1886, and LL.M. from Yale Law School in 1889. Then he was admitted to the bar, and practiced law in New York City.

Pavey was a member of the New York State Assembly (New York Co., 11th D.) in 1895.

He was a member of the New York State Senate (15th D.) from 1896 to 1898, sitting in the 119th, 120th and 121st New York State Legislatures.

He continued to practice law, and was active on political, economical, and foreign relations issues.

External links
 
 The New York Red Book compiled by Edgar L. Murlin (published by James B. Lyon, Albany NY, 1897; pg. 166ff, 404 and 511)
 Sketches of the members of the Legislature in The Evening Journal Almanac (1895; pg. 58)
 "REPARATIONS PLAN OFFERED TO HARDING", New York Times, December 25, 1922
 "F. D. PAVEY, LAWYER, ONCE STATE SENATOR", New York Times, April 16, 1946 

1860 births
1946 deaths
Republican Party New York (state) state senators
Lawyers from New York City
Republican Party members of the New York State Assembly
People from Washington Court House, Ohio
Yale Law School alumni
Politicians from New York City
Yale College alumni